Károly Potemkin (born 19 June 1977 in Budapest) is a Hungarian football player who currently plays for Faroese side NSÍ Runavík.

Resources
 Futballévkönyv 1999, I. kötet, 78–82. o., Aréna 2000 kiadó, Budapest, 2000  
Profile on siofok.com 
Profile on ftcbk.eu 
Stats on futball-adattar.hu 
 
 
 

1977 births
Living people
Footballers from Budapest
Hungarian footballers
Association football forwards
Budapesti VSC footballers
Ferencvárosi TC footballers
FC Tatabánya players
FC Fót footballers
Rákospalotai EAC footballers
Szombathelyi Haladás footballers
BFC Siófok players
Békéscsaba 1912 Előre footballers
Kecskeméti TE players
Vecsés FC footballers
Dunaújváros FC players
Jászberényi SE footballers
EB/Streymur players
B36 Tórshavn players
NSÍ Runavík players
Csepel SC footballers
Hungarian expatriate footballers
Expatriate footballers in the Faroe Islands
Expatriate footballers in Austria
Hungarian expatriate sportspeople in the Faroe Islands
Hungarian expatriate sportspeople in Austria